Wind is the movement of air.

Wind may also refer to:

People with the surname
 Wind (surname)
 Alex Wind (born 2001), American gun control activist
 Edmund De Wind (1883–1918), Canadian/Irish war hero
 Edgar Wind (1900–1971), British historian
 Hans Wind (1919–1995), World War II flying ace

Arts, entertainment, and media

Music

Groups
 Wind (band), a German musical group created in 1985
 Winds (band), a Norwegian progressive metal band formed in 1998
 The Wind (band), a California band formed in 2006
 w-inds., a J-Pop vocal group, formed in 2001

Musical instruments
 Wind instrument
 Woodwind instrument

Songs
 "Wind", a song by Akeboshi
 "Wind", a 2017 song by Monni from Analog Melody
 "The Winds", a 1960 song by Maurice Williams and the Zodiacs from their album Stay with Maurice Williams & The Zodiacs

Other uses in arts, entertainment, and media
 WIND (AM), a radio station in Chicago
 Wind (1992 film), a 1992 film about the America's Cup series of yachting races
 Wind (2019 film), an American animated short film
 Wind: A Breath of Heart, a 2002 visual novel
 "Wind", a speaking track from The Wiggles' 1991 debut album

Brands and enterprises
 Wind (Italy), a mobile telephone carrier in Italy (merged in 2016 with 3 Italy into Wind Tre)
 Wind Hellas, a mobile telephone carrier in Greece
 Wind Mobile, a mobile telephone carrier in Canada, now Freedom Mobile
 Wind Telecom, a telecommunications holding company in Netherlands
 Wind Telecom (Dominican Republic), a telecommunications provider in the Dominican Republic
 Wind Tre, a fixed and mobile telephone carrier in Italy
 Renault Wind, a roadster by French automobile manufacturer Renault

Computing and technology
 MSI Wind Netbook
 MSI Wind PC

Science and healthcare
 WIND (spacecraft), a NASA spacecraft launched in 1994 to study solar wind
 Flatulence, or passing wind, or passing gas
 Wind power, use of wind as a source of energy 
 Planetary wind, the outgassing of light chemical elements from a planet's atmosphere into space
 Solar wind, a stream of charged particles ejected from the sun

Other uses
 Wind River Range, or "the Winds", in Wyoming
 Wind (Miami), a skyscraper in Miami
 Wind god, or the winds, deities representing wind

See also
 WIND (disambiguation)
 The Wind (disambiguation)
 Wind-up (disambiguation)
 Winded
 Winding (disambiguation)
 Wound (disambiguation)